Aventis Graduate School is an international graduate business school based in Singapore. It was founded in 2007.

Aventis awards postgraduate and doctorate degrees in collaboration with leading universities including Baruch College (City University of New York); California State University, Sacramento;  Kingston University London; University of West London  and  Roehampton University in the United States and the United Kingdom.

History 
On 27 October 2018, Aventis won the Prestigious T.E.D 2018 Awards in Communications, Personal Effectiveness & Productivity Training. They also achieve the Gold Standard Awards for Senior Management and Leadership Development.
Alongside with recognition from Association of Psychotherapists and Counsellors (APACS).

On 3 February 2021, Aventis announce its collaboration with AI Singapore to incorporate AI Singapore certification into its Graduate Diploma in Artificial intelligence and Data Science programme.

On 10 August 2021, Aventis extend its industry partnership with SGInnovate, to brings together over 7000 regional and global corporations who represent go-to-market help, joint product development and investment funding exciting career opportunities for our students and alumni.

On 5 January 2022, Aventis Graduate School was officially renamed as Aventis Graduate School to represent its repositioning as a leading graduate school that offers graduate programmes in AI, Data Science, Business Analytics, Psychology and counselling thus we believe that removing the term “School of Management” will better reflect our position.

Educational Offerings

Executive Masters programs
Aventis collaborates with Zicklin School of Business at Baruch College to bring the Zicklin Executive Masters programs to Singapore for senior executives across ASEAN. The programs includes the Executive MBA, Executive Master of Science in Marketing & International Business, Finance, HR & Global leadership, Information Systems and Business Computing Information Systems and Psychology (Industrial and Organizational) and Entrepreneurship. Aventis also partners with Arcadia University, the University of Louisville and California State University, Sacramento, University of West London, Roehampton University and London Metropolitan University to offer an extensive suite of MBA and Specialized Masters degrees.

International Masters in Business Administration
In conjunction with California State University, Sacramento, Aventis began offering IMBA programs in the fall of 2012. Students can choose from three focuses of International Management, IT Management, or Finance. Part of the course is web based, with the remainder containing upfront lectures from Sacramento State faculty.

Graduate diploma programs
Aventis offers Graduate Diploma programs in marketing, finance & investment, risk management, service leadership, human capital development, training and development, organizational psychology, social psychology & counselling, and financial engineering. Aventis collaborates with professional bodies such as the Chartered institute of Marketing, American Association of Financial Management, and the Centre for Behavioral Science (CBS) to offer professional certifications.

Executive education
Aventis conducts leadership and professional development programs through collaboration with partners including Baruch College and the University of St Andrews. Senior management training offerings include Advanced Management Program (AMP); Global CEO Program; and Advanced CFO Program.

Research Centres of Excellence

Aventis School of Management has a number of research centres which are based on interdisciplinary and industry networks across different business communities. The centres are:

 Chinese Strategic Leadership: Sun Tzu Art of War Institute
 Artificial Intelligence and Automation: Aventis Advanced Analytics 
 Financial & Investment: Financial Training Academy
 Corporate Education: Aventis Learning Group
 Mental Wellness: Aventis Centre for Organizational Psychology & Wellness 
 MBA Research Centre: MBA Singapore Asia

Lectures, seminars, and workshops
Aventis regularly organises public lectures, featuring thought leaders from various disciplines to educate the public of the changing global environment. The school also organizes executive workshops and seminars in the following areas: finance and investment, accounting, general management, leadership, strategy, presentation skills, soft skills, decision making, people and performance management, marketing, innovations and entrepreneurship. The school also invites international speakers to conduct master class courses such as mergers and acquisitions and business valuations. Other events include joint collaboration with KhattarWong, a regional law firm, to co-sponsor a business conference in "Doing Business in ASEAN: Managing Your Risks in Today's Business World". This regional conference is supported by the Singapore Business Federation(SBF) and the Singapore institute of Directors (SID).

Customized in-house training
Programmes include mentoring and coaching, financial statement analysis, leadership development and market innovations.

Other activities
Aventis Graduate School is the sponsor of the HRM Awards 2009 for Best Graduate Development, The Singapore HR Awards organized by the Singapore Human Resources Institute (SHRI) and the Singapore HR Congress.

References

Business schools in Singapore
Educational institutions established in 2007
2007 establishments in Singapore